"Joy!" is a song by the English rock band Gay Dad from their first album, Leisure Noise, released as a single on 24 May 1999. It was featured in FIFA 2000 and in 2002 on a Mitsubishi television commercial. Additional vocals on the track are by Carol Kenyon.

A-Side

While most Gay Dad tracks were a collaborative effort, "Joy!" originates from a recording created by Cliff Jones ten years earlier as a student at Durham University. The finished track combines Krautrock metronomic beats, a fluid bass line and scruffy guitar riffs with a plethora of synth effects ultimately ending with a gospel recital of the lyric "Goodbye my darling I'm ready to die". In a Sound on Sound interview, lead singer Cliff Jones described the song as sounding "like a record that was made 10 minutes in the future".

Track listing

CD1
"Joy!" (single edit) - 3:40
"Sly" - 4:56
"Desire" - 5:43

CD2
"Joy!" (album version) - 5:00
"Electrogeist" - 5:39
"Twelve" - 4:14

10" Vinyl
"Joy!" (album version) - 5:00
"Desire" - 5:43

Cassette
"Joy!" (single edit) - 3:40
"Electrogeist" - 5:39
"Sly" - 4:56

Charts

References

1999 singles
1999 songs
Gay Dad songs
London Records singles